Garrison Brothers Distillery is a distillery in Hye, Texas. The distillery produces Texas Straight Bourbon, as well as some experimental variants. In 2006, the distillery was granted the first stiller's permit for bourbon outside of Kentucky and Tennessee, which makes it the oldest legal bourbon distillery in Texas. Garrison Brothers Distillery did not originally plan on ever selling outside the state of Texas, but it is sold in 42 states as of November 2021.

Garrison Brother's flagship "Cowboy Bourbon" consists of a few thousand barrel proof bottles released each year. The first batch was released in 2013, and a new batch has been released each year since 2015.

Distributor Allied Lomar Inc., who once sold a bourbon by the name "Cowboy Little Barrel", brought a trademark suit against the distillery due to its use of a similar product name. On July 18, 2018, the United States Court of Appeals for the Fifth Circuit affirmed an earlier jury verdict that allowed Garrison Brothers to use the name "Cowboy Bourbon" for Garrison's flagship product, ruling that the earlier trademark had been abandoned. 

In 2018, Garrison Brothers started a 501(c)(3) nonprofit called "Good Bourbon for a Good Cause" to raise money for to renovate Balmorhea State Park. Garrison Brothers also produced a double-barrel bourbon whiskey named after Balmorhea, which Texas Monthly described as having sweet and silky tasting notes.

Awards
Silver Medal, 2013 San Francisco World Spirits Competition, Small Batch Bourbon (Up to 10 Years) - Garrison Brothers Texas Straight Bourbon Whiskey, Texas, USA 

Bronze Medal, 2015 San Francisco World Spirits Competition, Straight Bourbon - Garrison Brothers Texas Straight Bourbon, Fall 2014 Vintage 

Silver Medal, 2016 San Francisco World Spirits Competition, Single Barrel Bourbon (Up to 10 Years) - Garrison Brothers Single Barrel Texas Straight Bourbon, Texas, USA 

Best Craft Whiskey Distillery, 2017 USA Today Readers' Choice

"US Micro Whisky of the Year" and "second best bourbon of the year" from Garrison Brothers Cowboy Bourbon harvested 2009 bottled 2015 from spirits writer Jim Murray in his book Jim Murray's Whisky Bible 2017.

"US Micro Whisky of the Year" for Garrison Brothers Balmorhea Bourbon from spirits writer Jim Murray in his book Jim Murray's Whisky Bible 2019.

References

External links 
 Garrison Brothers Distillery official website

Bourbon whiskey
Companies based in Texas